Leptosteges is a genus of moths of the family Crambidae.

Species
Leptosteges chrysozona (Dyar, 1917)
Leptosteges decetialis (Druce, 1896)
Leptosteges flavicostella (Fernald, 1887)
Leptosteges flavifascialis (Barnes & McDunnough, 1913)
Leptosteges fuscipunctalis 
Leptosteges nigricostella (Hampson, 1895)
Leptosteges onirophanta 
Leptosteges parthenialis (Dyar, 1917)
Leptosteges parvipunctella (Schaus, 1913)
Leptosteges pulverulenta Warren, 1889
Leptosteges semicostalis 
Leptosteges sordidalis (Barnes & McDunnough, 1913)
Leptosteges vestaliella (Zeller, 1872)
Leptosteges xantholeucalis (Guenée, 1854)

References

Schoenobiinae
Crambidae genera
Taxa named by William Warren (entomologist)